Drumraighland is a small village and townland in County Londonderry, Northern Ireland. In the 2001 Census it had a population of 69 people. It lies within Causeway Coast and Glens district. It was also formerly known as Drumraighlin.

References 

NI Neighbourhood Information System

Villages in County Londonderry
Causeway Coast and Glens district